Dupont is an unincorporated community in Flagler County, Florida, United States. It is located at the intersection of Dupont Road and US 1 southeast of Bunnell. The community is part of the Deltona–Daytona Beach–Ormond Beach, FL metropolitan statistical area.

References

Unincorporated communities in Flagler County, Florida
Unincorporated communities in Florida